Swayamvara Panthal is a 2000 Indian Malayalam-language drama film directed by Hari Kumar and written by Sreenivasan. It stars Jayaram and Samyuktha Varma. The music was composed by Johnson.

Plot

Deepu is the pet and indispensable brother of his five sisters. They need him right from taking their children for an outing to replacing gas cylinders and buying cosmetics. Deepu on his part is only too glad to be of help and thus has a special place in their hearts. As he comes of age, his sisters start searching for a suitable girl and after a great deal of hunting the unanimous choice is Priya. Deepu too likes her and the marriage is conducted much ceremoniously. But soon after, some shocking revelations dawn upon him and that too while he's on his honeymoon. Priya's strange behaviour baffles him and soon the entire family is convinced that she is mentally unstable. Even though his family persuades him to leave her and secure another peaceful life, Deepu choses to treat her in a secluded mental hospital with amiable atmosphere. There, he meets a doctor who gives freedom to patients and a whole lot of characters who are at once humorous and emotional. At the end, Priya gets cured but to everyone's shock, she seems to have forgotten Deepu and all about her marriage and yearns to meet her old lover. The movie ends happily with Priya accepting Deepu after realising the hardships he faced for her sake.

Cast 

 Jayaram as Deepu/Deepak
 Samyuktha Varma as Priya Radhakrishnan
 Lalu Alex as Doctor
 KPAC Lalitha
 Maniyanpilla Raju as S.I Vijayan
 V. K. Sreeraman as Balan
 Ambika as Latha Suresh
 Manju Pillai as Seema Nanthagopal
 Jayakrishnan as Nanthagopal
 Kannur Sreelatha as Malathy 
 Bindu Panicker as Vasanthy Vijayan
 Dimple Anand as Deepthi
 Sindhu Shyam as Maya
 Mammukoya as Chandran
 Sudheesh as Rameshan
 Kunchan as Kareem
 Innocent as Shankarbhanu/Thankappan Chingavanam
 Sreenivasan as James
 Janardhanan as Radhakrishnan
 Rajeev Parameshwar
 Ponnamma Babu as 
 Usha Venugopal as 
 Nivia Rebin
 J. K. Ambika
 Sruthi Lakshmi
 Maya Moushmi
 Gomathy Mahadevan
 Bindu Krishna
 Lizy Jose
 Jijoy Rajagopal as marriage photographer
 Sasi Plavila as building contractor

Soundtrack

The music was composed by Johnson and the lyrics were written by O. N. V. Kurup and Gireesh Puthenchery.

Awards
Kerala State Film Award for Best Actress - Samyuktha Varma

References

External links
 

2000 films
2000s Malayalam-language films
Films scored by Johnson